Chiococca is a genus of flowering plants in the family Rubiaceae. It currently holds 23 species that are native to Florida, Texas, Mexico, Central America, much of South America, the West Indies, and the islands of Galápagos and Fernando de Noronha.

The type species for the genus is Chiococca alba. It ranges from Florida to Paraguay and is cultivated as an ornamental.

Systematics
Chiococca was named by Patrick Browne in 1756. The generic name is derived from the Greek words χιών (chion), meaning "snow" and κόκκος (kokkos), meaning "kernel" or "berry".

Chiococca is a member of the tribe Chiococceae. Within the tribe, it is closely related to Bikkia.

Species

 Chiococca alba (L.) Hitchc. - Florida, Texas, Bermuda, Mexico, Central America, much of South America, the West Indies, and the Galápagos
Chiococca auyantepuiensis Steyerm. - Venezuela
 Chiococca belizensis Lundell - Southern Mexico (Tabasco, Chiapas, Oaxaca, Veracruz), Central America, Colombia
Chiococca caputensis Lorence & C.M.Taylor - Panamá
Chiococca coriacea M.Martens & Galeotti - México (Tamaulipas, Veracruz, Quintana Roo)
Chiococca cubensis Urb. - Cuba
Chiococca filipes Lundell - Central America, México (Chiapas)
Chiococca henricksonii M.C.Johnst. - México (Coahuila)
Chiococca insularis (Ridley) C.M.Taylor & M.R.V. Barbosa - Fernando de Noronha, Brazil
Chiococca lucens Standl. & Steyerm. - Venezuela (Sororopán-tepui)
Chiococca motleyana Borhidi - Belize, Guatemala, México 
Chiococca multipedunculata Steyerm. - Guyana
Chiococca naiguatensis Steyerm. - Venezuela 
Chiococca nitida Benth.
Chiococca nitida var. amazonica Müll.Arg. - Venezuela, Guyana, Brazil
Chiococca nitida var. chimantensis Steyerm. - Venezuela (Bolívar)
Chiococca nitida f. cordata (Cowan) Steyerm. - Guyana
Chiococca nitida var. nitida - French Guiana, Guyana, Venezuela, Colombia, Brazil, Paraguay 
Chiococca oaxacana Standl. - Mexico (Tamaulipas, Morelos, Puebla, Oaxaca)
 Chiococca pachyphylla Wernham - Mexico (from Nuevo León to Chiapas), Central America, Colombia
Chiococca petrina Wiggins - Mexico (Sonora)
 Chiococca phaenostemon Schltdl. - Southern Mexico (Chiapas, Oaxaca, Veracruz, Guerrero), Central America
Chiococca plowmanii Delprete - Brazil (Bahia)
Chiococca rubriflora Lundell - Mexico (Chiapas), Guatemala
 Chiococca semipilosa Standl. & Steyerm. - Mexico, Guatemala, Honduras, El Salvador, Nicaragua)
Chiococca sessilifolia Miranda - Mexico (Veracruz, Chiapas)
Chiococca steyermarkii Standl. - Guatemala
Chiococca stricta Correll - Bahamas

References

External links

 CRC World Dictionary of Plant Names: A-C At: Botany & Plant Science At: Life Science At: CRC Press
 Chiococca At: Search Page At: World Checklist of Rubiaceae At: Index by Team At: Projects At: Science Directory At: Scientific Research and Data At: Kew Gardens
 Chiococca At: Index Nominum Genericorum At: References At: NMNH Department of Botany At: Research and Collections At: Smithsonian National Museum of Natural History
 Chiococca At: Plant Names At: IPNI
 Chiococca In: The Civil and Natural History of Jamaica At: Record for Civ. Nat. Hist. Jam. At: Titles At: Biodiversity Heritage Library

Rubiaceae genera
Chiococceae
Flora of the Caribbean
Flora of Central America
Flora of South America